Sri Lanka Air Force Sports Club or Air Force SC may refer to:

  Sri Lanka Air Force Sports Club (cricket)
  Sri Lanka Air Force Sports Club (football)
  Sri Lanka Air Force Sports Club (rugby)